Zinc finger protein 180 is a protein that is encoded in humans by the ZNF180 gene.

Function

Zinc finger proteins have been shown to interact with nucleic acids and to have diverse functions. The zinc finger domain is a conserved amino acid sequence motif containing two specifically positioned cysteines and two histidines that are involved in coordinating zinc. Kruppel-related proteins form one family of zinc finger proteins. See MIM 604749 for additional information on zinc finger proteins.

References

External links

Molecular biology
Proteins
Proteomics